Doctor of Medicine Tommaso Lomonaco (1901–1992), one of the so-called guidonians, in the 1940s was strongly in favour of a multi-disciplinary approach to space sciences. He believed that aeronautical engineering and medicine were closely related and even more in the case of astronautics. He illustrated his experience on the interaction between the two sciences in a book, An MD Among Flyers. There, he states that both in the Guidonia labs and in the Aeronautic Engineering School, 'technicians, engineers, medicine doctors, biologists, university students and ITAF career officers worked side by side, merging their knowledge in a completely new way for those times'.

References
Brief biography of Tommaso Lomonaco

Bibliography 
Filippo Graziani, La Scuola di Scuola Ingegneria Aerospaziale nell’ottantesimo anniversario della sua fondazione 2006
Tommaso Lo Monaco, Un medico tra gli aviatori, Regionale Editrice

20th-century Italian scientists
1901 births
1992 deaths
Scientists from Rome